Aleksandr Vladimirovich Filimonov (born 15 October 1973) is a former association football goalkeeper from Russia. He won the 2011 FIFA Beach Soccer World Cup with the Russia national beach soccer team.

During his professional career, he was best known for playing for Spartak Moscow and the Russia national football team, as well as for the accidental goal he conceded in Euro 2000 qualifying playoffs from Andriy Shevchenko.

Early life and career
Born in Yoshkar-Ola, Filimonov spent his early years elsewhere in the USSR. He was interested in football from an early age since his father was a football coach.

After finishing with the Burevestnik football academy in Yoshkar-Ola, he moved to his first adult football team in summer 1990—FC Stal Cheboksary, from the Soviet Second League B. As a seventeen-year-old, he was only able to make two appearances in the season. That winter, he returned to Yoshkar-Ola and joined local team FC Druzhba Yoshkar-Ola to take part in the 1991 Soviet Second League B tournament. Soon Filimonov established himself as the first-choice goalkeeper for Druzhba and started 38 matches. He also scored a goal, which would prove to be the only one of his adult career.

As the 1991 season neared its end, the Soviet Union disbanded. At the beginning of 1992 Filimonov joined Fakel Voronezh, which unexpectedly joined the newly formed Russian Premier League, despite having finished mid-table in the Soviet First League. Despite his efforts, Fakel were relegated in their first season. Filimonov spent another season with Fakel in the Russian First League before moving to the Russian Premier League top-half team Tekstilshchik Kamyshin, having achieved 20 clean sheets in 37 matches in 1993, and a total of 71 appearances for Fakel.

At Tekstilshchik, Filimonov quickly established himself as first-team keeper and played his first European club tournament matches in 1994 in the UEFA Cup, against FC Nantes and Békéscsaba. Over the course of two seasons with Tekstilshchik, Filimonov became regarded as one of the most promising Russian keepers, and on 6 June 199, he debuted for the Russian U23 national team against San Marino and earned three U23 caps in autumn 1995.

Spartak Moscow
Filimonov's contract with Tekstilshchik expired in 1996, and the club's financial situation prevented them from renewing it. At the time, Spartak Moscow was looking for a new keeper to replace Stanislav Cherchesov, who had left for FC Wacker Innsbruck. Spartak had signed Ruslan Nigmatullin but also signed Filimonov to increase their squad's depth. Initially, Filimonov acted as backup for Nigmatullin and missed the opportunity to play in the UEFA Champions League, but over the course of his first season there, Filimonov became first-choice keeper again, as Georgi Yartsev preferred Filimonov's demonstrated consistency.

For most of the remainder of his career with Spartak, Filimonov was preferred for the club's starting XI. When he left the club in summer 2001, he had won six league titles, played in numerous Champions League games (including a 4–1 win over Arsenal), and became an established member of the Russian national team. By that time, Maksym Levytsky had become the club's preferred starting keeper.

Later career
After leaving Spartak, Filimonov was transferred to Dynamo Kyiv to cover for Oleksandr Shovkovskyi, who had picked up a serious injury. He made few appearances, as Vitaliy Reva became the preferred replacement for Shovkovskyi. Immediately after his Dynamo contract ended, he returned to Russia to play for Uralan Elista. After two seasons with Uralan, he was signed by FC Moscow. During the first half of the 2004 season, he featured regularly for Moscow, but by 2005, he was the club's third choice keeper and made no appearances.

In January 2007, Filimonov joined Cypriot side Nea Salamina. Before retiring from professional football, he also played for Kuban Krasnodar in Russia and Lokomotiv Tashkent in Uzbekistan.

In 2009, he was part of the Russia squad that won the 2009 Legends Cup, a tournament for retired players 35 and older.

In 2011, Filimonov switched to beach soccer and joined Lokomotiv Moscow, with whom he won a national title and super cup. His success in beach soccer earned him an invitation to the national team, with whom he won the 2011 FIFA Beach Soccer World Cup.

He subsequently returned to the Russian Football Premier League in the 2014–15 season at the age of 41 with FC Arsenal Tula, a team managed by his former Spartak and Russia teammate Dmitri Alenichev, after achieving three consecutive promotions from the fourth tier to the top tier. However, he lost his starting spot for Arsenal in the second half of the season and signed with the third-tier PFL team FSK Dolgoprudny for the 2015–16 season. He retired as a player upon the conclusion of the 2017–18 season, being the last active player of Soviet Union Football Championship.

International career 
Filimonov gained his first cap for the Russian national team on 25 March 1998 in a friendly match against France. He played four friendlies in 1998 but was not the main national keeper under managers Boris Ignatyev and Anatoly Byshovets. This changed when Oleg Romantsev, who had managed him at Spartak, became the national manager. Filimonov was the primary keeper of the Russian squad during Euro 2000 qualifying, where the team had an impressive run, including a 3–2 victory against France at the Stade de France on 5 June 1999.

A turning point in Filimonov's career occurred during Russia's match against Ukraine on 9 October 1999, where a win for Russia would qualify them for the Euro 2000 playoffs. Post-Soviet rivalry between Russia and Ukraine made this a highly anticipated match, resulting in Luzhniki Stadium being sold out for the first time in fifteen years. During the match, Russia dominated possession, but no goals came until the 75th minute, when Valery Karpin scored for Russia from a free kick. But at the 88th minute, Ukraine were awarded a free kick far from goal at the left edge of the field. Andriy Shevchenko kicked the ball straight at the hands of Filimonov, but Filimonov was not ready for the kick and conceded a goal. The match ended 1–1, and France qualified from the group while Ukraine went to the playoffs at Russia's expense.

Subsequently, Filimonov won another four caps for Russia, but only in friendlies. He did not play for Russia in any other competitive game. He was named in Russia's 2002 World Cup squad, but was not used in favor of his former Spartak teammate Ruslan Nigmatullin.

Honours
Russian Premier League: 1996, 1997, 1998, 1999, 2000, 2001
Russian Cup: 1998
Legends Cup: 2009
FIFA Beach Soccer World Cup: 2011
Russian Beach Soccer League: 2011
Russian Beach Soccer Super Cup: 2011

External links
Complete playing history 
National team statistics
Goal conceded against Ukraine in 1999 on YouTube

References 

1973 births
2002 FIFA World Cup players
Association football goalkeepers
Expatriate footballers in Cyprus
Expatriate footballers in Ukraine
Expatriate footballers in Uzbekistan
FC Elista players
FC Fakel Voronezh players
FC Kuban Krasnodar players
FC Moscow players
FC Tekstilshchik Kamyshin players
FC Spartak Moscow players
FC Dynamo Kyiv players
FC Dynamo-2 Kyiv players
Living people
PFC Lokomotiv Tashkent players
Nea Salamis Famagusta FC players
People from Yoshkar-Ola
Russian expatriate footballers
Russian footballers
Russia international footballers
Russia national football B team footballers
Russia under-21 international footballers
Russian Premier League players
Ukrainian Premier League players
Ukrainian First League players
Cypriot First Division players
FC Arsenal Tula players
Russian expatriate sportspeople in Cyprus
Russian expatriate sportspeople in Ukraine
Russian expatriate sportspeople in Uzbekistan
Russian beach soccer players
Sportspeople from Mari El
FC Olimp-Dolgoprudny players